Kyu-chul is a Korean masculine given name. Its meaning differs based on the hanja used to write each syllable of the name. There are 20 hanja with the reading "kyu" and 11 hanja with the reading "chul" on the South Korean government's official list of hanja which may be used in given names. 

People with this name include:
Chang Kyou-chul (1946–2000), South Korean boxer
Kim Kyu-chul (born 1960), South Korean actor, Best New Actor at the 1993 Chunsa Film Art Awards
Han Kyu-chul (born 1981), South Korean swimmer
Chang Gyu-cheol (born 1992), South Korean swimmer

See also
List of Korean given names

References

Korean masculine given names